Miryam Lumpini is a Swedish-born American-based tattoo artist and painter.

Early life
Lumpini was born on 3 December 1990 in Stockholm, Sweden to a Swedish mother and Congolese father. She was raised in the remote countryside of Gothenburg by her single mother.

Career
Lumpini moved to Los Angeles, California in 2012 to pursue a tattooing career after studying graphic design. She started tattooing as an amateur while in high school. She calls herself “The Witch Doctor”. She has been praised for her use of color.

Notable clients Lumpini has tattooed include Jhené Aiko, Skrillex, and Swae Lee.

Lumpini designed a shoe for Reebok.

Lumpini appeared as a cast member in the 2021 Netflix show Tattoo Redo when she was pregnant with her first son. In 2022, she gave birth to twin boys.

References 

1993 births
Living people
Swedish women painters
Artists from Stockholm
Tattoo artists
Artists from Los Angeles
People from Gothenburg
Swedish expatriates in the United States
21st-century Swedish women artists
Swedish people of Democratic Republic of the Congo descent